Laelia testacea is a moth of the family Erebidae first described by Francis Walker in 1855. It is found in India and Sri Lanka.

Palpi long and porrect (extending forward). Antennae bipectinate (comb like on both sides). Males have a blackish subapical patch to forewing, while females have an ochreous tinge.

References

Moths of Asia
Moths described in 1855